The NEC Cup was a Zhongguo Qiyuan Go competition, supported by NEC Corporation. It was held 14 times in total, from 1995 to 2009.

Outline
The winner's purse was 200,000 CY ($24,000).

Past winners

References

See also
NEC Cup, Japanese Go competition sponsored by the same company

Go competitions in China
NEC Corporation